{{Infobox person
| name          = Héctor Medina
| image         = Actor Hector Medina (cropped).jpg
| caption       = Medina at the 2016 Miami International Film Festival showing of 'The King of Havana| birth_name    = Héctor Medina Valdés 
| birth_date    = 1989
| birth_place   = Pinar del Río
| nationality   = Cuban
| other_names   = 
| citizenship   = Cuba
| education     = National School of Art
| alma_mater    = 
| occupation    = Actor
| years_active  = 2009 -
| known_for     = Viva, Ticket to Paradise| spouse        = 
| partner       = 
| children      = 
| parents       = 
| relatives     = 
| website       = 
}}

Héctor Medina is Cuban theatre, television and film actor. He is known for two Cuba's international film coproductions of latest years.

Biography
Héctor Medina was born in Pinar del Río in 1989. He studied acting in National School of Art of Cuba. Medina started his acting career in theatre and television. His television roles include suicidal character in Patrol 444 - police serial directed by Roly Peña, short movie Hemoglobin, directed by David Pérez and participation in series Adrenalin 360. He is member of Cuban theatre company The Public, managed by Carlos Diaz.

In 2019 he appeared in La 1 series Malaka.

 Filmography 

Awards and nominations
Héctor Medina received Adolfo Llauradó Award for Best Actor by the National Union of Writers and Artists of Cuba and the Award for Best Actor at the Ibero-American Film and Video Festival in Fortaleza, Brazil for his role of Alejandro in Ticket to Paradise''.

References

External links

Viva Official Trailer.

1989 births
People from Pinar del Río
21st-century Cuban male actors
Living people